Park Square may refer to:

 Park Square, Sheffield, England
 Park Square, Leeds, England
 Park Square, London, England
 Park Square, Rhode Island, United States
 Park Square (Boston), Massachusetts, United States

See also
 Park Square Tower, a cancelled project in the Park Square district of Dubai
 Park Square Mall, Bangalore, India
 Park Square Historic District (Franklinville, New York)
 River Park Square, mall in Spokane, Washington, United States
 Bay Park Square, mall in Green Bay, Wisconsin, United States